Karnol is a village and union council (an administrative subdivision) of Mansehra District in the Khyber-Pakhtunkhwa province of Pakistan.

Important Figures
Shoukat Nawaz Khan late (xNazim UC/Karnol,Founder of UC 'Karnol')
Anwar Rasheed Khan late (Journalist)
Iqbal Khan Late (Nayb Tehsildar Swat)
Sajid Ali Khan (Chairperson VC Karnol)
Ahmed Rasheed Khan(Numberdar VCKarnol and VC Brarkot)
Liaqat Ali Khan (Khan of Karnol)

Tribes
There are many tribes living in Karnol
Khan(khankhail)
Syeds(saadats)
Qureshi
Abbasi
Raja
Gujjar
Swati
there are people from many castes/tribes residing in Karnol

References 

Union councils of Mansehra District
Populated places in Mansehra District